The AmphiCoach GTS-1 is an amphibious passenger coach designed by a team that were essentially funded by Scotsman George Smith and built in Malta. The prototype was tested at Marsaxlokk Bay, Malta. The prototype was hand-built on the island over a three-year period 2004–2007 with a considerable contribution from former Malta Drydocks workers whose skill Smith described as "invaluable".

The price of the AmphiCoach GTS-1 is set to around £280,000. To date there is one vehicle in service, in Budapest, Hungary. A second vehicle was delivered to Belfast. The Amphicoach GTS-1 has full E.U. certification.

See also 

 List of buses

References

External links
 Official site
 Business Times of Malta article
 Budapest Service Official Site
 River Ride Budapest

Wheeled amphibious vehicles
Buses
Amphibious buses